Telegramm für X ("Telegram for X") is the fifth studio album by German singer Xavier Naidoo, released by Naidoo Records on 24 November 2005 in German-speaking Europe. In 2016 it was awarded a double platinum certification from the Independent Music Companies Association, which indicated sales of at least 800,000 copies+ throughout Europe.

Track listing
 Und – 4:20
 Bitte frag' mich nicht – 5:07
 Dieser Weg – 4:04
 Zeilen aus Gold – 5:31
 Oh My Lady – 5:40
 Seelenheil – 4:31
 Wo komm ich her – 4:57
 Bist du am Leben interessiert – 5:56
 Abgrund – 4:58
 Bist du aufgewacht – 4:08
 Sie sind nicht dafür – 4:27
 In DEINE Hände – 6:10
 Du bist wie ein Segen – 4:27
 Was wir alleine nicht schaffen – 3:44
 Danke – 7:20

Charts

Weekly charts

Year-end charts

Certifications and sales

Release history

References

External links
 

2005 albums
Xavier Naidoo albums